V669 Cassiopeiae or V669 Cas is an OH/IR star, a type of particularly cool red giant, with a spectral type of M9III. 

With a mean visual apparent magnitude 17.5, V669 Cassiopeiae varies with an amplitude of about half a magnitude.  In the mid-infrared L band, its magnitude range is 1.57 to 3.02.  It is listed as a possible Mira variable, but with the extremely long period of 1,994 days.

The distance and physical properties of V559 Cassiopeiae are highly uncertain.  Based on parallax, it is about 1,600 light years away, but a distance of about 20,000 light years has been derived based on observations of masers around the star.  Based on a luminosity derived from its pulsations and spectral energy distribution, it would be at a distance of 6,850 light years.

References 

Cassiopeia (constellation)
Cassiopeiae, V669
Mira variables
M-type giants